WUVT-FM (90.7 MHz) is a non-commercial FM radio station in Blacksburg, Virginia, serving Montgomery County, Virginia.  It is licensed to Virginia Tech and is operated by The Educational Media Company at Virginia Tech.  WUVT-FM is largely student-run and broadcasts a free form radio format.  The radio studios and offices are located in Squires Student Center.

WUVT-FM has an effective radiated power (ERP) of 6,500 watts.  The transmitter is on Price Mountain, off Stroubles Creek Road in Blacksburg.  It broadcasts from a tower shared with 105.3 WBRW.

History

Early years
WUVT, in one form or another, has been located on the campus of Virginia Tech since its founding. That makes it one of the longest running non-commercial radio stations in Virginia. It originally began operations when a student built an AM transmitter in his dorm room. Today, like other student media organizations on campus, WUVT is a division of The Educational Media Company at Virginia Tech.

WUVT is known for its eclectic programming, covering a wide swath of past and present music styles.  DJs are typically students and former students, who select content based upon their personal preferences. WUVT serves the community by offering music rarely heard on commercial radio stations.

Transmitter upgrade
Its transmitter is located on nearby Price Mountain, between Blacksburg and Radford, at a site shared with WBRW, "The Bear". The station transmits its signal with a Harris Z5CD solid state transmitter donated by Clear Channel.

Former WUVT Chief Engineer Kevin Sterne was injured in the April 16, 2007 killing spree by a Virginia Tech student. After hearing about Kevin’s strong passion for the radio station and WUVT's need to upgrade its aging transmitter, officials from Clear Channel and the Society of Broadcast Engineers assisted in returning WUVT to full power on April 28, 2007.   Clear Channel donated a Harris Z5CD transmitter, transmitter building, and antenna sufficient to generate 10 KW.  Orban, CBS Radio, and Electronics Research, Inc. (ERI) also offered equipment and technical assistance.

Power increase
Virginia Radio and TV website VARTV.com reported in 2007 that WUVT "has requested to move its antenna off-campus to a new location a mile away from and increase the antenna height from 141 feet to 429 feet.  WUVT wants to be licensed as a Class C3 (from Class A) and increase its power from 3,000 watts to 10,000 watts."

In June 2008, WUVT received authorization from the Federal Communications Commission to begin building a 6,500 watt transmission facility.  This construction permit was issued for a lower power than originally requested due to a conflicting application with WEHC, the Emory and Henry College radio station in Emory, Virginia, that also broadcasts at 90.7 MHz.  Both stations filed requests for power increases which would have overlapped, so both WUVT and WEHC re-submitted their applications at a lower power.

Over summer 2009, WUVT moved equipment to the new site atop Price Mountain and removed the old transmitter from its location atop Lee Hall. During the transitional period, WUVT broadcast at low power from Squires Student Center.

In September 2009, the station received permission to begin broadcasting at 6,500 watts.

Technical Accomplishments
 March 1947 - Low power AM station is put on the air by students.
 June 1969 - FM transmission authorized on 90.7 MHz with 10 watts ERP
 1970s - Upgraded license to 770 watts ERP, on the air with the original 10W exciter driving a 430W amplifier. The amplifier was hand built and FCC type accepted by Geoff Mendenhall, a student at Ga Tech who used it for a few years at their station. (Geoff went on to become VP of RF Transmission at Gates Radio/Harris Briadcast)
 Early 1980s - Upgraded license again, this time to 3,000 watts ERP, with new transmitter from Broadcast Electronics
 Late 1990s - Initiated RealAudio web simulcast
 Dec 2005 - First dynamic RDS subcarrier on in the New River Valley market
 Apr 2007 - Return to full licensed power
 September 2007 - filed application with the FCC to increase power
 June 2008 - received a construction permit from the FCC to begin building a 6,500-watt transmission facility
 September 2009 - transmission facility construction completed and station begins broadcasting at 6,500 watts

References

Related links
 Collegiate Times
 The Educational Media Company at Virginia Tech

External links
 WUVT Online
 

Variety radio stations in the United States
UVT-FM
UVT-FM
UVT-FM
Radio stations established in 1969
1969 establishments in Virginia